Mingjian is a rural township in Taiwan.

Mingjian may also refer to:

MingJian, a Chinese product-testing organization
Tian Mingjian (1964-1994), Chinese spree killer
Zhao Mingjian (born 1987), Chinese footballer
Michele Ruggieri (1543-1607), Italian jesuit priest and missionary known as "Lou Mingjian"
Mingjian yaojing, a part of Zhi (excrescences)